Afro-Caribbean leftism refers to  left-wing political currents that have developed among various African-Caribbean communities in the Caribbean, the United States of America, France, Great Britain, or anywhere else they have chosen to settle.

Spenceans
During the early nineteenth century, the Jamaican-born activists William Davidson and Robert Wedderburn were drawn to the politics of Thomas Spence.

Interwar era
Many Afro-Caribbean soldiers who served in the British West Indies Regiment (BWIR) became left-wing activists after the war during the interwar era. While serving in European and Middle Eastern fronts of the First World War, experiences of discrimination from white servicemen inspired a resurgence in anti-colonial nationalism among the British West Indian islands. The 9th Battalion of the BWIR initiated the Taranto Revolt, a mutiny against poor working conditions and a wage increase awarded to white but not black servicemen by the War Office. In response, the Worcestershire Regiment was dispatched to Taranto to suppress the mutiny; sixty BWIR servicemen were tried for mutiny, with one serviceman being sentenced to death by firing squad. Between 50 and 60 BWIR sergeants met on 17 December, 1918 to form the left-wing Caribbean League, which held four meetings in the following weeks. Aside from discussing various grievances held by the servicemen, the Caribbean League also discussed Caribbean nationalism and plans for a West Indian independence movement. Members of the League made plans to establish an office in Kingston, Jamaica, and organise strikes. After the colonial government started to crack down on the League, it disbanded. On February 1919, Army Order No. 1 was issued, extending the wage increase to the BWIR.

Prominent Afro-Caribbean leftists
 Toussaint Louverture (1743—1803), Haiti
 Robert Wedderburn (1762–1835/6?), Jamaica
 William Davidson (1781–1820), Jamaica
 William Cuffay (1788–1870) Gillingham, Kent, father from St Kitts
 James Carmichael Smith (postmaster) (born 1852), Bahamas
 Hubert Harrison (1883–1927), St Croix
 Cyril Briggs (1888–1966), Nevis
 Claude McKay (1889–1948), Jamaica
 Richard B. Moore (1893–1978), Barbados
 CLR James (1901–1989), Trinidad
 George Padmore (1903–1959), Trinidad
 Aimé Césaire (1913–2008), Martinique
 Claudia Jones (1915–1964), Trinidad
 Frantz Fanon (1925–1961), Martinique
 Stokely Carmichael (1941–1998), Trinidad
 Maurice Bishop (1944–1983), Grenada
 Bernard Coard (born 1944), Grenada
 Portia Simpson-Miller (born 1945), Jamaica
 Paul Gilroy (born 1956) London, mother from Guyana

See also
African-American leftism

References

Afro-Caribbean culture
Black Power
Caribbean diaspora
Politics of the Caribbean